Mt Pleasant Public School, also known as MPS, is an elementary and middle school in Mount Pleasant, Ontario, Canada. The school was built in 1959 and celebrated its 50th anniversary in 2009. Mount Pleasant Public School is a feeder school for Brantford Collegiate Institute. It is a Gold Medal Eco School.

Commitment to Education

MPS uses its resources, including a Smart board in every classroom, a small library and learning commons and a Lego Wall, to teach students the Ontario Education Curriculum. A focus on social responsibility has led to yearly community clean-ups on Earth Day.

The Leader in Me Program

Mt. Pleasant School has adopted the 7 Habits of Highly Successful People (by Sean Covey). They feel these habits can assist their students to develop as individuals, as well as strengthen the sense of community in their students.

Athletics

MPS sports teams are called the 'Mt. Pleasant Mustangs'. They compete in many sports at the local level including basketball, soccer, baseball and, most successfully, golf. The Mustang's mascot is a large black horse.

References

Elementary schools in Ontario
1959 establishments in Ontario